Teleiodes linearivalvata is a moth of the family Gelechiidae. It is found in South Korea and Japan.

The wingspan is 13–17 mm. Adults are similar to Telphusa syncratopa. Adults are on wing from the end of May to mid-August.

References

Moths described in 1977
Teleiodes